Messe Berlin are exhibition grounds in the Charlottenburg-Wilmersdorf precinct of Berlin, Germany, at Masurenallee opposite the Haus des Rundfunks. Since 2011, they have officially been known as "Berlin ExpoCenter City" and operated by the Messe Berlin GmbH company.

Overview
The premises, built in 1936–37, comprise twenty-six halls covering  including Funkturm Berlin. The halls are connected via a bridge to the Internationales Congress Centrum Berlin, which closed in 2014 until further notice. To the south is the CityCube Berlin, an exhibition and conference hall that opened in 2014, built on the lands of the former Deutschlandhalle arena, which has replaced the functions of the ICC.

Important trade fairs held here include Internationale Grüne Woche Berlin (Green Week), Internationale Funkausstellung Berlin (IFA), Internationale Tourismus-Börse (ITB), Youth fair YOU, Venus Berlin and InnoTrans.

References

External links

 website
 History

Buildings and structures in Charlottenburg-Wilmersdorf
Trade fair venues
Convention centres in Germany
Event management companies of Germany